Francisco Massinga (born 6 May 1986), better known as Whiskey, is a Mozambican football defender.

International career

International goals
Scores and results list Mozambique's goal tally first.

References

External links

1986 births
Living people
Mozambican footballers
Mozambique international footballers
Association football defenders
C.D. Maxaquene players
Clube Ferroviário de Maputo footballers
2010 Africa Cup of Nations players